Psebay is an urban locality (an urban-type settlement) in Mostovsky District of Krasnodar Krai, Russia. Population: 10,404 (2020),

References

Urban-type settlements in Krasnodar Krai
Mostovsky District